The Somali National Front (SNF) (Somali: Dhaqdhaqaaqa Jabhada Soomaliyeed) was a politico-military organization that operated in southern Somalia during the Somali Civil War and represented one of the major factions involved in the conflict.

After its creation following the collapse of President Siyaad Barre's government in 1991, the SNF was largely made up of remnants of the Somali National Army, along with splinter groups from the Somali Democratic Movement (SDM) and supporters of Barre.

The SNF would eventually merge into the internationally recognized Transitional National Government of Somalia in 2001.

History

Origins (1991 to 1993) 
After the fall of President Mohamed Siad Barre's government in 1991, many members of his Marehan sub-clan faced collective punishment and war crimes at the hands of anti-Barre rebel groups, particularly the United Somali Congress (USC). As a result, large numbers of the clan were forced to flee central Somalia, including the capital city of Mogadishu, and seek refuge in Gedo region bordering Kenya.

Soon after the exodus, the Somali National Front (SNF) was formed. Initially it was made up of loyalists to former Siad Barre and remnants of the Somali National Army. The intent behind its formation was to incorporate the major Darod clans into the faction, recapture Mogadishu and reinstate Barre's regime. The SNF appealed to clan unity as a reason to join the organizations struggle, and this appeal was further strengthened by the indiscriminate killings of Somalis belonging Darod sub-clans that were perceived as being associated with the regime of the former president. These killings, carried out by rebel factions like the USC, led to a sense of solidarity among members of the Darod clan and consequently resulted in many rallying under the banner of the SNF.

The organization was in large part responsible for the severity of the 1992 famine. After President Siad Barre had been ejected from Mogadishu by Aidids forces in January 1991, the faction withdrew to the south of the city into Somalia's fertile breadbasket. Lacking supplies of their own, Barres forces ravaged the grain stores of inter-riverine agricultural belt around the Jubba and Shebelle rivers. This dire food supply situation was further exacerbated by fighting between Barre and rebels, the most powerful of which were led by General Mohamed Farah Aidid, who were attempting push Barre out of Somalia entirely.

In its first years the organization possessed approximately 9000 troops, seven T54/T55 tanks and eighteen 122 mm artillery pieces.

Governance 

For most of the civil war, the SNF governed and conducted operations in the Gedo region of southern Somalia. In an effort to restore order in the area, the SNF supported the creation of an Islamic Sharia court to resolve disputes and a police force to maintain order. As a result, a relatively effective governing administration was established in the region. The SNF's political leadership, led by former Defense Minister General Omar Haji Masallah, was based in Nairobi, Kenya, while the military wing was led by General Mohammed Hashi Ghani based in the city of Luuq, Gedo. The organization would be consistently represented at all major national reconciliation and peace conferences over the 1990s.

Although the SNF was primarily made up of members of the Marehan sub-clan of the Darod, it reportedly had significant support in the region, despite the presence of non-Darod and non-Somali minority groups in the Juba and Dawa river basins. Initially, the SNF had used Siad Barre's name to gain support, but found that this was generally counterproductive to their efforts among Somalis outside the Marehan clan.

In 1991, a faction of the Somali Democratic Movement (SDM) broke away and merged with the SNF. Later, under General Omar Haji Masallah, the SNF achieved some of its major political goals by uniting the Marehan with other Darod clans led by General Mohammed Said Hersi Morgan.

Conflict with United Somali Congress, Somali Liberation Army and United Nations 
In March to April 1991, heavy fighting broke out between the United Somali Congress (USC) and SNF forces. The SNF lost control of Kismayo, one of Somalia's largest and most strategic cities, and was consequently forced to withdraw to the city of Bardera and parts of the Gedo region. However, in November 1991 to March 1992, the SNF advanced back into the territory it had lost months earlier, taking advantage of infighting among its opponents. This action prompted the creation of the opposing Somali Liberation Army (SLA), a military coalition composed of numerous rebel groups led by General Mohamed Farah Aidid. The SLA would later become the precursor to the Somali National Alliance (SNA), another significant faction in the Somali Civil War that the SNF would come into direct conflict with.

In fall of 1992, following the recent formation of the SNA led by Aidid, his prime rival, Ali Mahdi Muhammad of the Somali Salvation Alliance (SSA) began supporting the SNF in an attempt to create his own pan-clan alliance.

In early 1993, fighting broke out in the Galkayo region between the Aidid's SNA and the Somali Salvation Democratic Front (SSDF) led by Abdulahi Yusuf Ahmed. In response, SNF forces under the command of Morgan entered the Galguduud region to support the SSDF. At around the same time fighting broke out between Morgan's forces at the strategic port city of Kismayo and the American and Belgian UN forces deployed there.

1994 to 2001 
Following a series of clashes with the Somali Democratic Movement (SDM) in early 1994, a conference was organized by communities in the Gedo and Bay regions. The conference was attended by representatives of the SNF and the SDM, as well as a large number of community elders, clan leaders, and intellectuals from both regions. The purpose of the conference was to reconcile the SNF and the SDM and to unite the peoples of the two communities, and it was largely successful in achieving these goals.

Conflict with Al-Itihaad al-Islamiya and early Sharia Courts 
Like Aidids SNA and Ali Mahdi's SSA, the SNF also began opposing the rising strength of the Islamic courts appearing in southern Somalia. A sharia court established in Luuq District of Gedo region by Sheikh Mohamed A. Nuur in 1992 (with the blessing and support of the SNF) reportedly had more success than the courts appearing in Mogadishu at addressing lawlessness. Consequently Luuq district was considered to be one of the safest places in Somalia. Concerned with the sharia courts rising popularity and authority, the SNF and the Ethiopian military collaborated to destroy the Gedo Islamic Court, resulting in an increase of inter-clan warfare in the region.

On 10 August 1996 heavy fighting erupted near Kenya's border city of Mandera during clashes between Al-Itihaad al-Islamiya (AIAI) and the SNF, backed by Ethiopian Air Force helicopter gunships. While pursuing AIAI, SNF and Ethiopian forces had allegedly crossed the border and Mandera was inadvertently bombed three times during the battle resulting in the death of a Kenyan soldier. This would lead to the imposition of a curfew on the North Frontier District and the Kenya Defence Force being put on full alert.

Creation of Autonomous state of Jubaland 
Following a two month long conference in July 1998, Mohammed Siad Hersi Morgan (head of the SNF at the time) announced in September that he planned to set up an autonomous state of Jubaland, with the port of Kismayo as its capital. The objective of the movement was not to break away from Somalia, but rather to search for a "bottom up" solution to the country's issues through a new approach.

Fracture, Ethiopia and conflict with Jubba Valley Alliance 
In the late 90s the SNF had fractured into pro and anti-Ethiopian factions. In 1999, Ethiopia made another incursion into Somalia in support of a breakaway faction within the SNF in conflict with the original SNF led by General Omar Haji, which Ethiopia had previously supported against AIAI and the Islamic courts.

That same year, the SNF would entirely lose control of Gedo region when a military coalition united under the banner of the Allied Somali Force (later named the Jubba Valley Alliance) launched an offensive in the area.

Merger with Somali government (2001) 
In June 2001, SNF would merge into the Transitional National Government of Somalia (TNG)

Structure
Leaders: Ali Mohamed Mokhtar (Dr. Ali Nur) Gen Omar Hagi Massale, Burale, Mohamud Sayid Aden, General Mohammed Hashi Gaani, Col Barre Hiiraale, Col. Abdirizak Issak Bihi, Col. Osman Haji Ahmed and Noor Matan Abdi Garaad who was stronger leader from the Reer Garaad sub-clan in Marehan clan. 
Area of Operations: Southern and Central Somalia; occasional forays to outskirts of Mogadishu and neighboring borders.
Tribal Affiliation: Marehan (Mareehaan)
Founded: March 1991

References

Communism in Somalia
Factions in the Somali Civil War
Political parties established in 1991
Rebel groups in Somalia
1991 establishments in Somalia